The 2009–10 Air Force Falcons men's basketball team represented at the Air Force Academy. Led by third year coach coached Jeff Reynolds. They played their home games at the Clune Arena on at the Air Force Academy's main campus in Colorado Springs, Colorado and are a member of the Mountain West Conference. They finished the season 10–21, 1–16 in Mountain West play and lost in the quarterfinals of the 2011 Mountain West Conference men's basketball tournament to UNLV. They were not invited to a post season tournament.

Roster

Schedule and results 

|-
!colspan=9 style=| Regular season

|-
!colspan=9 style=| Mountain West tournament

See also 
 2010–11 NCAA Division I men's basketball season
 2010–11 NCAA Division I men's basketball rankings

References 

Air Force
Air Force Falcons men's basketball seasons
Air Force Falcons
Air Force Falcons